Jurassic World: Fallen Kingdom (Original Motion Picture Soundtrack) is the film score for the 2018 film of the same name composed by Michael Giacchino. The album was released by Back Lot Music on June 15, 2018 digitally and physically.

Background
Following his previous work on the 2015 film Jurassic World, Giacchino confirmed in December 2016 that he would return to score the film's sequel. At the moment he was also working for several other films, including Spider-Man: Homecoming, War of the Planet of the Apes, and Incredibles 2. Ludwig Wicki conducted the score and Jeff Kryka provided the orchestrations.

Track listing
All the music is composed by Michael Giacchino. The soundtrack's last track "At Jurassic World's End Credits/Suite", contains the original music from the theme  of the 1993 film Jurassic Park, composed by John Williams. Other, more subtle, uses of the Jurassic Park theme are found in "Nostalgia-Saurus", "Volcano to Death", where it is used in a minor key, and an unreleased piano recording used during a scene in the Lockwood Manor where Claire tells Owen about the first time she saw a dinosaur.

Charts

References

2018 soundtrack albums
2010s film soundtrack albums
Back Lot Music soundtracks
Adventure film soundtracks
Jurassic Park film scores
Michael Giacchino soundtracks